Campbell is a suburb of Canberra, Australian Capital Territory, Australia. Covering an area to the South East of the central business district, Campbell sits at the base of Mount Ainslie and is bounded to the south east by the Mount Pleasant Nature Reserve.

The suburb of Campbell is named after Robert Campbell, the owner of Duntroon station on which Campbell is now located. Many buildings built by Robert Campbell and his family are still standing around Canberra, including Blundell's Cottage, St John the Baptist Church, Reid, Duntroon House (now part of RMC Duntroon) and Yarralumla House (now Government House).

Located in Campbell are the Australian War Memorial, Royal Military College, Duntroon, the Australian Defence Force Academy, and the former corporate headquarters of the CSIRO, which is awaiting demolition and redevelopment.  Also with addresses in the suburb are the 'Ainslie Village' accommodation centre for people with special needs and the Campbell Park Offices.

Schools located in the suburb include Campbell High School, Campbell Primary School and Canberra Grammar Northside Infant School.

Population
In the 2021 Census, there were 6,564 people in Campbell. 70.5% of people were born in Australia. The next most common country of birth was England at 3.9%. 77.7% of people only spoke English at home. The most common responses for religion were No Religion 48.9%, Catholic 17.8% and Anglican 8.3%.

Geology

Most of Campbell is dominated by the lowest layer of the Ainslie Volcanics, a grey dacite and other erupted particles such as agglomerate and tuff.  In the north is grey quartz andesite, a higher layer of the Ainslie Volcanics.  In the north east is cream rhyolite from the highest layer of the Ainslie Volcanics.  The Ainslie Volcanics were formed in the Silurian period.
A layer of the Tertiary age pebbly gravels is around Anzac Parade, left over from when the Molonglo river was at a 
higher level.

Gallery

References

Suburbs of Canberra